Johnny Moore Tiger Jr. (Muscogee Creek-Seminole), (February 13, 1940 – August 5, 2015) was a Native American artist from Oklahoma.

Background
Johnny Moore Tiger Jr. was born on February 13, 1940, in Tahlequah, Oklahoma. His parents were Lucinda Lou Lewis and the John M. Tiger. His younger brother, the late Jerome Tiger, was a celebrated artist.<ref name=ohs>Hunt, David C. "Tiger, Jerome Richard (1941–1967). Oklahoma History Center's Encyclopedia of Oklahoma History and Culture. Retrieved August 12, 2015.</ref>  As a child, he traveled with his grandfather Rev. Coleman Lewis, a well known Baptist missionary within the Muscogee Creek Nation. While traveling, Coleman taught his grandson the history and cosmology of their people in the Mvskoke, their tribal language. He is uncle to Dana Tiger.

He attended Chilocco Indian School and graduated from Muskogee Central High School in 1958. After graduation, he served in the United States Air Force.

Art career
As a young man Tiger loved pin striping hot rods but moved towards fine arts. His paintings illustrated the oral history of his tribes, and he painted scenes such as a tribal gathering, stomp dances, or medicine men healing the sick, based on his own experiences.

In 1959, he enrolled at Bacone College in Muskogee, Oklahoma, to study art under the legendary Southern Cheyenne painter Dick West. His classmates included David E. Williams and Joan Hill. After winning numerous major art awards by the late 1970s, he became a full-time artist. The Five Civilized Tribes Museum declared Johnny a Master Artist in 1982.

Tiger was also a well-known sculptor. He received many major awards and produced several bronze pieces.

Death
Johnny Tiger Jr. died on August 5, 2015. Funeral services were held at the First Baptist Church in Eufaula, Oklahoma, and he was interred at the Greenwood Cemetery in Eufaula.

See also
 Dana Tiger

Notes

References
 Lester, Patrick D. The Biographical Directory of Native American Painters. Norman: University of Oklahoma Press, 1995. .
 Wyckoff, Lydia L., ed. Visions and Voices: Native American Painting from the Philbrook Museum of Art''. Tulsa, OK: Philbrook Museum of Art, 1996. .

External links
Oral History Interview with Johnny Tiger Jr.

1940 births
2015 deaths
Muscogee (Creek) Nation people
Native American painters
Native American sculptors
Painters from Oklahoma
People from Tahlequah, Oklahoma
Seminole Nation of Oklahoma people
Sculptors from Oklahoma
20th-century Native Americans
21st-century Native Americans